Blaine Hogan (born January 29, 1980) is an American actor.

Early life
Born in Minnesota, he graduated from Butler University in Indianapolis, Indiana. While at Butler, he adapted Franz Kafka's "Before the Law" as the short play "The Door", which was performed on two snowy evenings in an alleyway in Broad Ripple.  Hogan previously appeared as Gregor Samsa in Steven Berkoff's adaptation of The Metamorphosis.

Career
He has performed on stage in Indianapolis and Chicago at the Indiana Rep, Chicago Shakespeare, and the Goodman Theatre. He appeared in the Fox television drama Prison Break as a young prisoner, Seth Hoffner. Hogan's other roles at Butler included Rosencrantz in William Shakespeare's Hamlet (whom he played as a Niles Crane-style neat freak on a stage with a dirt floor) and Guildenstern in Tom Stoppard's Rosencrantz & Guildenstern Are Dead.  He also played Hedwig and Tommy Gnosis in a sold-out extended run of Hedwig and the Angry Inch at the Phoenix Theatre (in which he pointed out that Jim Jones preached in the same building) and Snoopy in Snoopy!!! at Edyvean Repertory Theatre.

Personal life
He is currently the creative director at Willow Creek Community Church in Chicago.  His first book, UNTITLED: A collection of essays on the creative process releases July, 2011.

Filmography 
 Prison Break
 Red Harvest (2007 film)
 The Letter (2002 film)

External links 
blainehogan.com
send blaine to mars
thoughts from  mars - the blog
difted - starving jesus series
interview at bibledude.net

American male stage actors
American male television actors
1980 births
Living people
Butler University alumni